Don Richardson (1878–1953) was an American fiddler who may have made the first country music recording in 1914, eight years before the first generally recognised country recording was made in 1922.

Discography 
COLUMBIA

A-2018   Durang's Hornpipe (Mx 46759 April 1916)
A-2018   Mississippi Sawyer (Mx 46754 April 1916)

A-2140   Old Zip Coon (Mx 46757)
A-2140   Arkansas Traveler (Mx 46755)

A-2575   Devil's Dream (Mx 46756)
A-2575   Miss McLeod Reel (Mx 46755)

A-3424   Dance With The Girl With A Hole in Her Stocking  (Mx 79842)            
A-3424   Annie Laurie/White Cockade (Mx 79845)

A-3452   Soldier's Joy/Massa/Turkey in the Straw (May 1921-Mx 79844)
A-3452   Little Yaller Gal/Old Black Joe (May 1921-Mx 79843)

A-3527   Hull's Victory/Quiltin' Party (Mx 79850)
A-3527   Limber Up Reel/Old Oaken Bucket/Speed the Plough (Mx 79851)

A-3581   Opera Reel/Nellie Gray/Ivy Leaf (Mx 79852)
A-3581   Rickett's Hornpipe/Pig Town Fling (Mx 79849)

S-5644   A Perfect Day/Dear Old Girl-Waltz (Dec. 1914-Mx 37125)

OKEH

1147   Dance With the Gal With A Hole in Her Stocking
1147   The Devil's Dream/Old Black Joe Medley

1169   Mississippi Sawyer-Medley (February 1919)
1169   McLeod's Reel (February 1919)

1254   Irish Washerwoman (July 1919)
1255   Arkansas Traveler  (July 1919)

PHONOLA (Kitchener)

1147   Devil's Dream
1147   Dance With A Gal With A Hole In Her Stocking

SILVERTONE

46757   Old Zip Coon - Medley
46758   Arkansas Traveler
46759   Durang's Hornpipe - Medley

LITTLE WONDER (5" Records)

908   Durang's Hornpipe & Kentucky Home Violin solo
909   Mississippi Sawyer & Massa's In the Cold, Cold Ground, Violin solo (not aurally identified)

References

External links
A 1916 recording of Richardson playing "Arkansas Traveler" at the Internet Archive
More recordings at the Internet Archive

American fiddlers
Old-time fiddlers
Year of death missing
1878 births